The New Earth is an expression used in the Book of Isaiah ( & ), 2 Peter, and the Book of Revelation (21:1) in the Bible to describe the final state of redeemed humanity. It is one of the central doctrines of Christian eschatology and is referred to in the Nicene Creed as the world to come.

Biblical references
The twenty-first chapter of the Book of Revelation introduces the final state of perfection where, according to one commentator, "cosmic time has been turned into eternity."  In symbolic and visual language, God allows John to see the glory and beauty of the inheritance of His people. The first thing the reader notices about this vision is that it includes a "new heavens and a new earth" (21:1). To understand what the Bible teaches about eternity, the reader of the Apocalypse must understand the New Testament doctrine of the "New Heavens and the New Earth."

The basic difference with the promises of the Old Testament is that in Revelation they also have an ontological value (: "Then I saw 'a new heaven and a new earth,' for the first heaven and the first earth had passed away, and there was no longer any sea...'He will wipe every tear from their eyes. There will be no more death' or mourning or crying or pain, for the old order of things has passed away") and no longer just gnosiological (: "See, I will create/new heavens and a new earth./The former things will not be remembered,/nor will they come to mind").

Interpretation
In Koine Greek, there were two words that are translated as "new" in the English Bible; neos and kainos. One Greek resource states:

That kainos should not be taken as something totally new can be seen in a passage like the following:

Here the Apostle Paul uses kainos in the expression "new creation." Paul did not intend to convey the idea that this is a completely different individual. There is continuity between the old person and the new person to such an extent that it remains the same person, but renovated. The person is the same, but the quality of that person has been transformed.

In the same way, the biblical concept of the New Earth is one of renovation and restoration. Either on this current earth or on a rebuilt new planet. This conclusion is supported by Peter's words in his public speech in the temple at Jerusalem.

This earth, however, will be either cleansed or destroyed by a great great very hot tempature of heat or fire, for the purpose of restoration as expressed in the following passage:

See also

 New Jerusalem

References

External links 
 Then I Saw a New Heaven and Earth
 Manual for Cosmic Victory: The New Earth
 Lamb & Lion: The New Earth
 Parallel Translations of Rev 21:1
 A New Heaven and a New Earth: The Case for a Holistic Reading of the Biblical Story of Redemption 
 Tour of Heaven: New Earth
 What are The New Heavens and New Earth

New Earth
New Earth
New Earth
Biblical cosmology
Book of Isaiah
Second Epistle of Peter